Phalonidia docilis is a species of moth of the family Tortricidae. It is found in Rio de Janeiro, Brazil.

The wingspan is about 11 mm. The ground colour of the forewings is creamy with ochreous creamy suffusions, which are darkest in the distal third of the wing. The costal strigulation (fine streaking) is brown. The hindwings are brownish grey, but paler basally.

References

Moths described in 2002
Phalonidia